The Church of St. Mary is the parish church in the village of Worsbrough in South Yorkshire, England. It is a Church of England church in the Diocese of Sheffield. Parts of the chancel are early Norman but the church underwent several alterations in the 14th and 15th century including the installing of the south door with its Gothic inscription which dates to 1480.

Seventy five miners who were killed in the 1849 Darley Main Colliery disaster lay buried in the churchyard in a mass grave.

See also
Grade I listed buildings in South Yorkshire
Listed buildings in Worsbrough

References

External links

Grade I listed churches in South Yorkshire
Church of England church buildings in South Yorkshire